Jean Alphonse Braure (born 24 May 1935) is a sailor from United States Virgin Islands, who represented his country at the 1984 Summer Olympics in Los Angeles, United States as helmsman in the Soling. With crew members Kirk Grybowski and Marlon Singh they took the 22nd place.

References

External links
 
 
 

1935 births
Living people
United States Virgin Islands male sailors (sport)
Olympic sailors of the United States Virgin Islands
Sailors at the 1984 Summer Olympics – Soling
Sailors at the 1988 Summer Olympics – Tornado
Sailors at the 1992 Summer Olympics – Tornado